Dichelobius is a genus of centipedes in the family Henicopidae. It was described by Austrian myriapodologist Carl Attems in 1911.

Species
There are three valid species:
 Dichelobius bicuspis Ribaut, 1923 - New Caledonia
 Dichelobius etnaensis Edgecombe & Giribet, 2004 - Australia (QLD)
 Dichelobius flavens Attems, 1911 - Australia (WA)

References

 

 
 
Centipede genera
Animals described in 1911
Taxa named by Carl Attems